Landale is a name derived from the Old French word launde, which means "forest glade". Spelling variations include Lansdale, Landall, Landell, and Landells. It is also the name of a very small clan in Scotland north of Edinburgh.

Landale
 David Landale (1868–1935), British-Hong Kong politician
 D. F. Landale(1905–1970), British-Hong Kong politician, son of David Landale
 James Landale (born 1969), BBC journalist
 Jock Landale (born 1995), Australian basketball player
 Robert Landale (1832–1903), Australian politician
 Stenhard Landale (1905–1977), British businessman

Lansdale
 Edward Lansdale (1908–1987), United States Air Force officer
 Joe R. Lansdale (born 1951), United States Army officer involved with the Manhattan Project
 John Lansdale Jr., (1912–2003), American 
 Kasey Lansdale, American singer-songwriter
 Philip Lansdale (1858–1899), United States Navy officer
 Thomas Lancaster Lansdale (1748–1803), American member of the Society of the Cincinnati

Landell
 Ethan Ebanks-Landell (born 1992), English footballer
 Ricky Landell (born 1982), American professional wrestler
 Roberto Landell de Moura (1861–1928), Brazilian priest and inventor

Landells
 Ebenezer Landells (1808–1860), British engraver and illustrator
 Jack Landells (1904–1986), English footballer
 Suzie Landells (born 1964), Australian swimmer

Fictional characters
In the Phantasy Star series, Landale may refer to:
 Waizz Landale, founder of the Landale royal dynasty, who united the lands of Palma together under his rule
 Alis Landale (born AW 326), Waizz's descendant, the heroine in Phantasy Star
 Aures Landale, Alis's father and king of Palma, who died suddenly shortly after Alis's birth
 Nero Landale (born AW 324), Alis's older brother, whose murder prompts Alis to set out on her quest
 Rolf Landale (born AW 1263), Alis's descendant, the main character and protagonist in Phantasy Star II
 The Landale, a raider warship commanded by the space pirate Tyler in Phantasy Star II; in Phantasy Star IV, it is recovered by Chaz's party and used for interplanetary travel